Malomukachevo (Bäläkäy Moqas) is a rural locality (a village) in Meleuzovsky Selsoviet, Meleuzovsky District, Bashkortostan, Russia. The population was 193 as of 2010. There is 1 street.

Geography 
Malomukachevo is located 9 km north of Meleuz (the district's administrative centre) by road. Kutushevo is the nearest rural locality.

References 

Rural localities in Meleuzovsky District